Rizalthus anconis is a species of crabs in the family Xanthidae, the only species in the genus Rizalthus.

References

Xanthoidea
Monotypic arthropod genera